Scrobipalpa aganophthalma is a moth in the family Gelechiidae. It was described by Edward Meyrick in 1931. It is found in Tibet.

References

Scrobipalpa
Moths described in 1931